Erwin Kroggel (30 April 1912 – January 1996) was a German fencer. He competed in the individual épée event at the 1952 Summer Olympics.

References

1912 births
1996 deaths
German male fencers
Olympic fencers of West Germany
Fencers at the 1952 Summer Olympics